Hellgate High School is a located in Missoula, Montana, United States. It is the largest high school in the Missoula County Public Schools District. Hellgate has approximately 1200 students, and a faculty of approximately 100. It is an AA high school, the classification given to Montana's largest high schools. It was ranked Montana's ninth-best high school by US News in 2014.

History

First established in 1908 as Missoula County High School, the school was later renamed Hellgate High, shortly after the foundation of Sentinel High School. Hellgate is one of the oldest high school buildings in the State of Montana. It is a three-story building blending several different forms of architecture, with a network of tunnels.

On September 24, 1952, the morning after giving his Checkers speech, Republican vice-presidential candidate Richard Nixon spoke at the school. He denied that politics was a dirty game, and stated that if students thought it was, they should get involved and clean it up.

The name Hellgate High School was not used until well after the building now known as Sentinel High School opened in 1956. Originally, what is now known as Sentinel was to be the new Missoula County High School replacing what is now known as Hellgate. As Missoula grew, classes were slowly returned to the Hellgate building, the 9th graders, then the 10th graders. In the mid‑1960s, Hellgate and Sentinel were created as separate four‑year high schools, with all the old team names going to Sentinel, and the new team names (pages, squires, and knights) were created with all new traditions. Before Sentinel opened, Missoula County High School was the only public high school in Missoula, with Frenchtown High School the only other public high school in the County. Hellgate is named for Hellgate Canyon, a passage carved by the Clark Fork River through the mountains where Blackfeet warriors would lay in wait for the Salish. French trappers called the canyon , translated as "". Hell Gate Canyon remained a dangerous site until 1855, when the Flatheads and Blackfeet signed a treaty.

Programs

Academic
In 2007, the Hellgate Academic WorldQuest team received first place in the state competition, and second in the nation. The team returned to nationals in 2010 and 2014.

Music
Hellgate High Schools successful music programs send many band, orchestra, choir, and jazz students to the All-Northwest and All-State programs each year.

Choir
In 1997, the Choir Director received the Milken Family Foundation's National Educator Award.

In 2014, Hellgate's choir was selected to sing at Carnegie Hall.

Missoula Youth Choir
Formed in 1987 by founders David Heidel and Dean Peterson, for the sole purpose of performing at the first International Choral Festival, the Missoula Youth Choir has performed at every Festival since.  is composed of select high school students from Missoula's public high schools.  conductors are local Missoula high school directors who have collaborated on many school festival and concerts.

Band
John Combs, the school's former band director, who , serves as the fine arts supervisor for Missoula County Public Schools, was named outstanding music educator in both Montana and the Rocky Mountain West in 2010.

Notable alumni
Steve Albini, Musician
John Engen, Mayor
John Morrison, Politician
Allen Vizzutti, Musician
Forrest O'Connor, Musician
Blaine Taylor, college basketball coach

References

External links
Official site
Hellgate Band
Hellgate Alumni

High schools in Missoula, Montana
Public high schools in Montana
1908 establishments in Montana
Educational institutions established in 1908